In linguistics, a conservative form, variety, or feature of a language is one that has changed relatively little across the language's history, or which is relatively resistant to change. It is the opposite of innovative, innovating, or advanced forms, varieties, or features, which have undergone relatively larger or more recent changes. Furthermore, an archaic form is not only chronologically old (and often conservative) but also rarely used anymore in the modern language, and an obsolete form has fallen out of use altogether. 

A conservative linguistic form, such as a word or sound feature, is one that remains closer to an older form from which it evolved, relative to cognate forms from the same source. For example, the Spanish word caro /'karo/ and the French word cher /ʃɛʀ/ are both adjectives meaning dear or beloved that evolved from the Latin word cārum /'ka:rum/. The Spanish word, which is more similar to the common ancestor, is more conservative than its French cognate.

A language or language variety is said to be conservative if it has fewer new developments or changes than related varieties do. For example, Icelandic is, in some aspects, more similar to Old Norse than other languages that evolved from Old Norse, including Danish, Norwegian, or Swedish, while Sardinian (especially the Nuorese dialects) is regarded by many linguists to be the most conservative Romance language. Recent studies regarding the stability of modern Icelandic appear to confirm its status as "stable". Therefore, Icelandic and Sardinian are considered relatively conservative languages. Likewise, some dialects of a language may be more conservative than others. Standard varieties, for example, tend to be more conservative than nonstandard varieties, since education and codification in writing tend to retard change.

Writing is generally said to be more conservative than speech since written forms generally change more slowly than spoken language does. That helps explain inconsistencies in writing systems such as that of English; since the spoken language has changed relatively more than has the written language, the match between spelling and pronunciation is inconsistent.

A language may be conservative in one respect while simultaneously innovative in another. Bulgarian and Macedonian, closely related Slavic languages, are innovative in the grammar of their nouns, having dropped nearly all vestiges of the complex Slavic case system; at the same time, they are highly conservative in their verbal system, which has been greatly simplified in most other Slavic languages.

In the 6th century AD, Classical Arabic was a conservative Semitic language compared with Classical Syriac, which was spoken at the same time; Classical Arabic strongly resembles reconstructed Proto-Semitic, and Syriac has changed much more. Compared to closely related modern Northeastern Neo-Aramaic, which is not necessarily directly descended from it, Classical Syriac is still a highly archaic language form. Georgian has changed remarkably little since the Old Georgian period (the 4th/5th century AD). A roughly analogous concept in biology is living fossil.

See also 
 Great Vowel Shift
 Historical linguistics
 Philology
 Prestige (sociolinguistics)

References

Historical linguistics